The Bridgeton School is an historic school building located at 16 Laurel Hill Avenue in Burrillville, Rhode Island.

The -story wood-frame schoolhouse was designed by George W. Spaulding and built in 1897 by Nehemiah Kimball & William H. Gory.  It served the Burrillville public schools until 1966.  In 1970 it was reopened for use as a kindergarten as the Joseph Sweeney School.  It was finally closed in 1995, and was then transferred to the Burrillville Historical & Preservation Society.  It is the best preserved of Burrillville's late 19th-century school buildings.

The building was listed on the National Register of Historic Places in 2006.

See also
National Register of Historic Places listings in Providence County, Rhode Island

References

School buildings on the National Register of Historic Places in Rhode Island
Burrillville, Rhode Island
Schools in Providence County, Rhode Island
School buildings completed in 1897
National Register of Historic Places in Providence County, Rhode Island
1897 establishments in Rhode Island